Physopsis is a genus of plants in the mint family, Lamiaceae, first described in 1849. The entire genus is endemic to the State of Western Australia.

Species
 Physopsis chrysophylla (C.A.Gardner) Rye
 Physopsis chrysotricha (F.Muell.) Rye
 Physopsis lachnostachya C.A.Gardner
 Physopsis spicata Turcz.
 Physopsis viscida (E.Pritz.) Rye

References

External links

Lamiaceae
Endemic flora of Australia
Lamiaceae genera
Taxa named by Nikolai Turczaninow